3e temps (pronounced Troisième temps) is the third studio album of Grand Corps Malade. It most notably includes a collaboration by Charles Aznavour, a favorite artist of Fabien Marsaud (Grand Corps Malade).

Track list
"1er janvier 2010" (feat. Frederic Yonnet)
"Définitivement"
"A l'école de la vie"
"Roméo kiffe Juliette"
"Éducation Nationale"
"J'attends"
"Tu es donc j'apprends" (feat. Charles Aznavour)
"Un verbe"
"Rachid Taxi"
"Jour de doute"
"Bulletin météo"
"A Montréal"
"Nos absents"
"L'heure d'été" (feat. Elise Oudin-Gilles)

Charts

References

Grand Corps Malade albums